Brandon L. Garrett (born July 1, 1975) is the L. Neil Williams, Jr. Professor of Law and director of the Wilson Center for Science and Justice at Duke University School of Law, where he has taught since 2018. He was previously the White Burkett Miller Professor of Law and Public Affairs and Justice Thurgood Marshall Distinguished Professor of Law at the University of Virginia.

References

External links

Faculty page

Living people
1975 births
Duke University School of Law faculty
Yale University alumni
Columbia Law School alumni
University of Virginia faculty
American legal scholars